Le Glorieux (18 February 1984 – 19 Aug 2010) was a British-bred Thoroughbred racehorse. In 1987 he achieved the extraordinary feat of winning three Group one races on three different continents when he won the Grosser Preis von Berlin in Europe, the Washington, D.C. International in North America and the Japan Cup in Asia.

Trained by Robert Collet, and owned by German businessman, Werner Wolf, from his base at the Chantilly Racecourse, Le Glorieux made seven starts at age two, winning once and finishing second on three occasions. At age three, the colt won three races from a base in Germany and blossomed into an international star.

Retired to stud, Le Glorieux's progeny have met with limited success in racing.

Le Glorieux died at his owner Werner Wolf's Haras du Logis Saint-Germain in Normandy, France on 19 Aug 2010, at the age of 26.

Pedigree

References
 Le Glorieux's pedigree and partial racing stats
 November 1, 1987 New York Times article on the Washington, D.C. International Stakes

1984 racehorse births
2010 racehorse deaths
Racehorses bred in the United Kingdom
Racehorses trained in France
Japan Cup winners
Thoroughbred family 11-d